Les femmes nouvelles ('The New Women'), was a women's organization in France, founded in 1934.

Its purpose was to work for the introduction of women's suffrage. It was founded by Louise Weiss, who became its chair person. The association was founded because of what was perceived as the passivity of the contemporary women's movement and politicians in France in the issue of women's suffrage. 

The association was in contrast to organize and participate in intense demonstration and actions in favor of women's suffrage during the 1930s. It arranged a number of public actions which attracted considerable attention. However, the activity did not result in the introduction of women's suffrage because of the strong resistance toward the reform in the French Senate. 

The struggle of suffrage was abruptly interrupted by the outbreak of the Second World War and the invasion and occupation of France. Women's suffrage was introduced in France after the liberation of 1944.

References 

Feminist organizations in France
1934 establishments in France
Political organizations based in France
Women's suffrage in France
Organizations established in 1934
Voter rights and suffrage organizations
1934 in women's history